The Rab cake is a traditional Croatian cake which originates from the Adriatic island of Rab. Its main ingredients are almonds and Maraschino liqueur and it is traditionally baked in the shape of a spiral, although today several shapes are popular.

History
According to legend, this cake was first served in 1177 to Pope Alexander III when he consecrated the Assumption Cathedral in Rab. On that occasion, the cake was prepared by nuns from the monastery of Saint Anthony, and later by Benedictines from the monastery of Saint Andrew.

Rab cake became a delicacy reserved for wealthy families and aristocrats living on the island of Rab in the time when Rab was a part of the Venetian Republic. Today, Rab cake is prepared only for festive occasions like weddings, baptisms, etc. It is also a very popular souvenir because it has a shelf life of about two months.

Rab cake was depicted on a Croatian kuna 8.60  postage stamp issued by the Croatian Post in July 2020.

See also
 List of cakes
 List of pastries

References

External links
HIC-hrvatski proizvod 
Recipe for Rab cake 

Croatian desserts
Cakes
Almonds
Rab